Patricia Lea Jenkins (born July 24, 1971) is an American film director, screenwriter, and producer. She has directed the feature films Monster (2003), Wonder Woman (2017), and Wonder Woman 1984 (2020). For the film Monster, she won the Independent Spirit Award for Best First Feature and the Franklin J. Schaffner Award of the American Film Institute (AFI). For the pilot episode of the series The Killing (2011), she received a Primetime Emmy Award nomination and the Directors Guild of America award for Best Directing in a Drama Series. In 2017, she occupied the seventh place for Times Person of the Year.

Early life
Jenkins was born in Victorville, California, to William T. Jenkins, a U.S. Air Force officer and fighter pilot who earned a Silver Star in the Vietnam War, and Emily Roth, who later worked in San Francisco as an environmental scientist. Her older sister is Elaine Roth, her younger sister is Jessica Jenkins Murphy.

She spent her early childhood moving frequently due to her father's military service. Having lived briefly in Thailand and Germany, the family eventually settled in Lawrence, Kansas. When she was seven years old, her father died during a NATO mock dogfight at the age of 31. During a road trip from Kansas to San Francisco, her mother dropped Jenkins and her sister off at a movie theater, where they watched the original Superman starring Christopher Reeve. Jenkins found the film inspiring, and the experience sparked an interest in pursuing filmmaking as a career.

She completed kindergarten through her junior year of high school while living in Lawrence. Her mom then moved the family to Washington D.C. where Patty completed her senior year of high school. She received her undergraduate degree in Painting  from The Cooper Union for the Advancement of Science and Art in 1993, and a master's degree in directing from the American Film Institute's AFI Conservatory in 2000. While a student at AFI, Jenkins, an avid fan of the films of Pedro Almodóvar, made the 2001 short film Velocity Rules, that she describes as a cross between a superhero film and Almodóvar's tone about an accident-prone housewife.

Beginning in junior high school, Jenkins took interest in photography, painting, and screen-printing. At age 20, while interning at a commercial production company, she heeded a suggestion that she could receive film training if she worked on set for free. After doing so for some months, Jenkins advanced to second assistant camera and focus puller, then spent eight years as a cameraperson. While shooting a Michael Jackson music video, her director of photography recommended that she attend the American Film Institute to learn directing. She later made a superhero short film that played the AFI Fest. There she met Brad Wyman, who later introduced her to producer Donald Kushner, leading to her directing her first feature film, Monster (2003).

Career

2001–2014: Monster success and TV projects
Patty Jenkins started her career with Just Drives (2001) as her first film as director, she would later follow it up with Velocity Rules (2001). This film follows a housewife who finds out she is a superhero and then has to choose between a life of excitement and glamour or her husband. The film ended up being a Recipient of the Warner Brothers Production Grant.

This ended up moving her towards the film Monster (2003); at first she tried to get producer Brad Wyman to direct, but under his advice she ended up writing the script herself. Jenkins ended up writing to the film's subject, serial killer Aileen Wuornos, who was a street prostitute who went on a 1989–1990 murder spree of seven of her male clients, and was at the time was on death row. Wuornos was initially distrustful of Jenkins but on the night before her execution, left Jenkins all of her personal letters which convinced Jenkins that she was the only one who could direct the film.

With a budget of $1.5 million and Charlize Theron attached to the film, Monster ended up being a commercial and critical success, grossing $64.2 million and earning Theron her first and only Oscar to date for Best Actress in a Leading Role. Noted film critic Roger Ebert ranked Monster 1st on his list of the best films of 2003 and later in 2009, ranked it 3rd on the list of the best films of the decade. For this film, Jenkins won the Independent Spirit Award for Best First Feature and the Franklin J. Schaffner Award of the American Film Institute (an award for outstanding graduates of the AFI Conservatory), and also was nominated for the Edgar Allan Poe Award for Best Screenplay.

After the success of the film Monster, Jenkins was approached by former United States Air Force test pilot Chuck Yeager to develop a film about his life. When that project did not reach fruition, she attempted to make a Ryan Gosling movie titled I Am Superman, a film with no relation to the DC Comics character, but development ended when she became pregnant. Jenkins spent the next decade working in television.

In 2011 she directed one segment in the made-for-television anthology film Five. Jenkins received an Emmy nomination because of her work on the film. Jenkins directed many ads and TV programs like episodes of Arrested Development and Entourage. She received an Emmy nomination again for the directing work done on AMC's The Killing pilot. In October 2011, she was hired to direct Thor: The Dark World, the first sequel to 2011 superhero film Thor, but left the project after less than two months due to creative differences. In 2014, she was attached to Sweetheart, a film about a female assassin, but that film was never made.

2015–present: Breakthrough and worldwide fame
In 2015, Jenkins signed on as director for the DC Extended Universe film Wonder Woman, with a screenplay by Allan Heinberg and a story co-written by Heinberg, Zack Snyder and Jason Fuchs, and starring Gal Gadot. The film was released in June 2017 and gave Jenkins the biggest domestic opening for a female director, surpassing previous record holder Fifty Shades of Grey by Sam Taylor-Johnson. With this film, Jenkins also became the first female director of an American studio superhero movie. The film was acclaimed by both critics and audiences and grossed over $800 million worldwide, exceeding box office original predictions. Wonder Woman eventually became the highest-grossing film directed by a woman, surpassing previous record holder Mamma Mia! by Phyllida Lloyd. However, in 2019, Frozen II directed by Jennifer Lee (with Chris Buck) and Captain Marvel, directed by Anna Boden (with Ryan Fleck) became number 1 and 2 respectively, dropping Wonder Woman and Jenkins to number 3.

While promoting Wonder Woman, Jenkins mentioned that her next project would likely be a limited television series developed with her husband. This project was later revealed as a horror series titled Riprore to premiere on the video-on-demand service Shudder. In July 2017, the US cable network TNT announced Jenkins would direct the premiere of a six-episode television drama, I Am the Night, written by her author husband Sam Sheridan and featuring her Wonder Woman star Chris Pine. She additionally served as an executive producer.

In September 2017, Variety reported Jenkins would return to direct Wonder Woman 2. However, on MTV's "Happy, Sad, Confused" podcast, Jenkins revealed that she considered walking away from the sequel due to salary dispute between her and Warner Bros. On December 6, 2017, Jenkins was named by Time magazine as a 7th runner-up for Time Person of the Year.

Wonder Woman 1984 was scheduled to be released by Warner Bros. Pictures in the United States on June 5, 2020, but, due to the COVID-19 pandemic, the release was delayed until December 25, 2020, worldwide. It had originally been scheduled for November 1, 2019; unlike the first film, the sequel received a mixed critical reception and was a box office failure. She has been negotiating the terms of her contract with Warner Brothers for an estimated 7 to 9 million dollars, which would be a record breaking salary for a female filmmaker. She signed on to the first film with no guarantee of directing a second film, but envisioned the second one during the making of Wonder Woman, which turned out to benefit her greatly. When she was signed on to do the second film, she had the ability to get a much higher salary than she would have if she had been signed on to do both films from the beginning. Her goal with her negotiations were to make sure she would get the same salary that her male counterparts would be getting for doing this movie and she seems to have succeeded.

In October 2020, it was revealed that Gal Gadot and Jenkins will be teaming up again for the film Cleopatra. The film will star Gadot as the titular Cleopatra, the historical pharaoh of ancient Egypt, with Jenkins as the director. In December 2021, Jenkins dropped out of the film, but remained as a producer, to instead focus on a third Wonder Woman film and the Star Wars spin-off film Rogue Squadron.

In November 2020, a spin off film set in the Wonder Woman universe focusing on the Amazons of Themyscira was confirmed to be in early development. Jenkins will not return to direct the film but cowrote the script with writer Geoff Johns. In 2021, Warner Bros. announced a third installment of the Wonder Woman franchise with Jenkins attached to write and direct. However, in December 2022, it was reported by The Hollywood Reporter that Jenkins' third film would not be moving forward after all and was considered to be "dead in its current incarnation", as the film did not fit with the newly appointed DC Studios heads' plans for the DC Extended Universe or its upcoming successor, the DC Universe.

In December 2020, Disney announced that Jenkins was hired to direct Rogue Squadron, a Star Wars spin-off film inspired by the group of starfighter pilots of the same name. The film was scheduled to be released on December 22, 2023. Jenkins will be the first female director to helm a Star Wars film but is not the first female director within the overall franchise. In June 2021, The Hollywood Reporter reported that Matthew Robinson had been hired by Lucasfilm to write the script. In November 2021, it was reported that the film's production had been delayed due to scheduling conflicts with other projects Jenkins was developing. In September 2022, Disney removed Rogue Squadron from their release schedule. The film was then shelved in March 2023.

Other work
Jenkins, Wonder Woman actresses Gal Gadot and Lynda Carter, DC Entertainment President Diane Nelson, and U.N. Under-Secretary General Cristina Gallach appeared at the United Nations on October 21, 2016, the 75th anniversary of the first appearance of Wonder Woman, to mark the character's designation by the United Nations as its "Honorary Ambassador for the Empowerment of Women and Girls". The gesture was intended to raise awareness of UN Sustainable Development Goal No. 5, which seeks to achieve gender equality and empower all women and girls by 2030. The decision was met with protests from UN staff members who stated in their petition to UN Secretary-General Ban Ki-moon that the character is "not culturally encompassing or sensitive", and served to objectify women. As a result, the character was stripped of the designation, and the project ended December 16.

Style and themes 
In the film Monster, Jenkins explored the issues of morality and femininity. In Wonder Woman, Jenkins suggests that the audience experiences the journey of the lead character Diana Prince through Diana's eyes. Diana is portrayed as the universal human character that the audience never experiences from the outside. Jenkins suggests that the major theme of the film is the idea that there are no other villains than humans themselves. She mentions how she was influenced by Superman and how that is incorporated in her own superhero film.

Connie Nielsen (who plays Hippolyta in the Wonder Woman franchise) said that Jenkins fought for feminist themes to be included in the Wonder Woman film and rejected the idea of including a controversial origin story for the Amazons which portrayed them as victims rather than warriors.

Some of Jenkins' mentors and influencers include Gary Ross, Kathryn Bigelow and Steve Perry. She mentions that she often likes to discuss the process of making soundtracks with musicians like Perry, who was a musical consultant on her film Monster. The organization and structure of music, according to Jenkins, has a lot of parallels to theatre and drama. As a director, she uses this rhythm to direct the delivery of dialogues.

Personal life
In 2007, Jenkins married Sam Sheridan, a former firefighter and the author of the book A Fighter's Heart. They have a son and reside in Santa Monica, California.

Filmography

Short films

Feature films

Television 

Acting credits

Accolades
In 2004, for her work on Monster, she won the Independent Spirit Award for Best First Feature and the Franklin J. Schaffner Award of the American Film Institute (an award for outstanding graduates of the AFI Conservatory). In 2011, Jenkins received an Emmy nomination for Outstanding Directing for a Drama Series for the pilot of The Killing. She received two nominations at the 2012 Directors Guild of America Awards for Outstanding Directorial Achievement, one for Dramatic Series for The Killing and the other for Movies for Television/Mini-Series for Five; she won the former.

Awards and nominations

See also
 List of female film and television directors

References

External links

 

1971 births
Living people
American women film directors
American women screenwriters
American women film producers
American television directors
American television producers
American women television directors
American women television producers
Action film directors
People from Victorville, California
Film directors from California
Screenwriters from California
Film producers from California
AFI Conservatory alumni
Cooper Union alumni
Directors Guild of America Award winners
Hugo Award winners